Theophanes III of Jerusalem was the Greek Orthodox Patriarch of Jerusalem from 1608 to 1644.

The early life of Patriarch Theophanes is largely unknown. As the successor to Sophronius IV, Theophanes continued Sophronius' defense of Orthodox rights to the Christian shrines in the Holy Lands. In 1611, with a decree from the Ottoman sultan, Theophanes was able to fend off the Armenians from taking over the celebration of the Holy Light.

Due to careless financial management by Serbian monks who lived at the Monastery of Saint Sabas, Theophanes was forced to sell holy heirlooms of value to avert surrendering the monastery and its metochion of the Archangel to the Latins and Armenians. During 1631 to 1634, the patriarch was successful in obtaining a number of firmans from Sultan Murad IV that continued those of Mehmed II and Selim I, thus fending off demands of the French ambassador in Constantinople.

In April 1619, Patriarch Theophanes traveled to Moscow to participate in the enthronement of Metropolitan Philaret as Patriarch of Moscow on June 1, 1619. In August 1620, when he was returning from his visit to Moscow, Patriarch Theophanes erected a new metropolis on the territory of the Polish–Lithuanian Commonwealth — the Metropolis of Kiev, Galicia and all Ruthenia. He consecrated Job Boretsky as the first metropolitan and also other bishops, during a stop in Kiev. These consecrations restored the Orthodox hierarchy in the area that was occupied by Uniate bishops after the Union of Brest in 1596 when Metropolitan Michael Rohoza turned to support the union.

Patriarch Theophanes reposed in 1644.

References

Sources
 Period of the Ottoman Turks Rule
 Kiev
Encyclopedia of Ukraine - Boretsky Yov

17th-century Greek Orthodox Patriarchs of Jerusalem
17th-century Eastern Orthodox archbishops